The 2013 Asian Acrobatic Gymnastics Championships were the 8th edition of the Asian Acrobatic Gymnastics Championships, and were held in Pavlodar, Kazakhstan from April 25 to April 30, 2013.

Medal summary

Medal table

References

External links
 Results

2013 in gymnastics
2013
International gymnastics competitions hosted by Kazakhstan
2013 in Kazakhstani sport